Lourdes Academy High School is a Roman Catholic high school in Oshkosh, Wisconsin, United States. It operates within the Diocese of Green Bay and was established in 1959.

History
The planning and construction, in the late 1950s, of a central Catholic high school represented the combined efforts of six Catholic parishes in Oshkosh, Wisconsin: St. Mary, St. Peter, St. Vincent, Sacred Heart, St. Josaphat, and St. John.

Construction of the school began in September 1958, with the first classes beginning in September 1959. The first year there were 306 freshmen and sophomores (155 girls and 151 boys) enrolled. Boys and girls attended separate classes with the upper floors for girls and lower floors for boys. Some facilities were used by both, including science and chemistry labs, the gymnasium, chapel, cafeteria, and library. The school was known as Lourdes High School and staffed with De La Salle Christian Brothers until 2001.

On August 1, 2012, the Unified Catholic Schools of Oshkosh (which included all of the catholic schools in Oshkosh) merged to become the grades 4K-12 Lourdes Academy. Upon consolidation, Lourdes Academy included the high school, middle school (formerly St. John Neumann) and two elementary school campuses (formerly St. Frances Cabrini and St. Elizabeth Ann Seton). Following the 2017-2018 school year, Lourdes Academy closed the St. France Cabrini campus and consolidated the two elementary schools to the Seton campus. This campus is now called Lourdes Academy Elementary.

Campus addition
The Bill Behring Commons, completed in 2005, is a large open space facing Witzel Avenue. It serves as cafeteria, all-school worship site, and performing arts center. The commons has a large gathering hallway and space with adjoining rest rooms, trophy cases, concession facilities, the athletic directors' office, and staff lounge. The lobby connects gym facilities, band room and the student commons, and serves as a reception and gathering area. A new gymnasium and a new band classroom were also constructed.

Faculty and staff

High school

References

Roman Catholic Diocese of Green Bay
Catholic secondary schools in Wisconsin
Buildings and structures in Oshkosh, Wisconsin
Educational institutions established in 1959
Schools in Winnebago County, Wisconsin
1959 establishments in Wisconsin